The English Springer is a breed of gun dog in the Spaniel group traditionally used for flushing and retrieving game. It is an affectionate, excitable breed with a typical lifespan of twelve to fourteen years. They are very similar to the Welsh Springer Spaniel and are descended from the Norfolk or Shropshire Spaniels of the mid-19th century; the breed has diverged into separate show and working lines. The breed suffers from average health complaints. The show-bred version of the breed has been linked to "rage syndrome", although the disorder is very rare. It is closely related to the Welsh Springer Spaniel and very closely to the English Cocker Spaniel; less than a century ago, springers and cockers would come from the same litter. The smaller "cockers" hunted woodcock while the larger littermates were used to flush, or "spring", game. In 1902, The Kennel Club recognized the English Springer Spaniel as a distinct breed. They are used as sniffer dogs on a widespread basis. The term Springer comes from the historic hunting role, where the dog would flush (spring) birds into the air.

Description 
The English Springer Spaniel is a medium-sized compact dog. Its coat is moderately long with feathering on the legs and tail. It is a well proportioned, balanced dog with a gentle expression and a friendly wagging tail. This breed represents perhaps the greatest divergence between working and show lines of any breed of dog. A field-bred dog and a show-bred dog appear to be different breeds but are registered together. The gene pools are almost completely segregated and have been for at least 70 years. A field-bred dog would not be competitive in a modern dog show, while a show dog would not have the speed or stamina to succeed in a field trial.

The English Springer Spaniel field-bred dogs tend to have shorter, coarser coats than show-bred dogs. The ears are less pendulous. Field-bred dogs are wiry and have more of a feral look than those bred for showing. The tail of the field-bred dog may be docked a few inches in comparison to the show dog.  Field-bred dogs are selected for their sense of smell, hunting ability, and response to training rather than appearance.

Show dogs have longer fur and more pendant ears, dewlaps and dangling flews. The tail is docked to a short stub in those countries that permit docking. They are generally more thickly boned and heavier than field-bred springers.

The English Springer Spaniel is similar to the English Cocker Spaniel and at first glance, the only major difference is the latter's smaller size. However English Springers also tend to have shorter, and higher-set ears than English Cockers. Springers also tend to have a longer muzzle; their eyes are not as prominent, and the coat is less abundant. The major differences between the Welsh Springer and the English Springer are that the Welsh have more limited colors and tend to be slightly smaller.

Coat and colors 
Field-bred dogs tend to have shorter, coarser coats than the longer furred show-bred dogs. They normally only shed in summer and spring months but shed occasionally in the autumn. The coat comes in black or liver (dark brown) with white markings or predominantly white with black or liver markings; Tricolour: black and white or liver and white with tan markings, usually found on eyebrows, cheeks, inside of ears and under the tail. Any white portion of the coat may be flecked with ticking.

Sizes 
According to the UK Breed Standard, the English Springer Spaniel should be  at the withers. The females should be  and usually . Working types can be lighter in weight and finer in bone.

Temperament 
The typical Spaniel is friendly, eager to please, quick to learn and willing to obey. In the right circumstances, it can be an affectionate and easy-going family dog. Its alertness and attentiveness make it a good hunting companion. A typical Springer Spaniel will often choose one person in the family to be most loyal to and stick with that person as much as possible; they are often referred to as a "velcro dog". The English Springer Spaniel ranks 13th in Stanley Coren's The Intelligence of Dogs and is considered an excellent working dog. It has exceptional stamina and needs moderate amounts of activity, to focus its mind and to provide exercise, although this is different for each dog.  Its long-legged build makes it among the fastest of the spaniels.

It is a sociable breed that enjoys the company of children and handles the company of other pets well. The hunting breed may not get along well with cats, however. If left alone for too long, they can become destructive and mischievous through boredom.

Health 
The English Springer Spaniel has a typical lifespan of 10.5 to 15 years. As in most breeds, some health problems are more likely to occur. Hip dysplasia and progressive retinal atrophy (PRA) (a degeneration of the retina causing vision loss leading to blindness) are two such diseases for which veterinarians are working on genetic markers to determine carriers. Another problem can be elbow dysplasia. Retinal dysplasia (RD), which can cause blindness and Phosphofructokinase deficiency (PFK), which is a genetic deficiency that impairs the ability of cells using carbohydrates for energy are two other hereditary conditions for which both lines of the English springer spaniel should be screened before breeding. Health issues are usually similar in both types of English Springer however phosphofructokinase deficiency, in particular, can appear more in field lines, however, carriers in show lines have been identified.

As with most spaniels and floppy-eared dogs, they are prone to ear infections. There are several types of common infections, and treatment typically includes oral antibiotics and cleaning the ear canal daily with a solvent that will also leave the ear in an acidic state to slow the growth of yeast and bacteria. Other health problems include autoimmune diseases, which include allergies and other sensitivities to the environment. They can also be susceptible to various eye problems including inward or outward curling eyelashes or even an additional row of eyelashes, all of which can require corrective surgery.

English Springer Spaniels tend to gain weight easily, and owners need to be careful about their food consumption. The English Springer Spaniel weight ranges from 44 to 45 pounds. A healthy Springer Spaniel should eat about 1,350 calories per day.

History 
The English physician John Caius described the spaniel in his book the Treatise of Englishe Dogs published in 1576. His book was the first work to describe the various British breeds by function. By 1801, Sydenham Edwards explained in the Cynographia Britannica that the land spaniel should be split into two kinds, the Springing, Hawking Spaniel, or Starter; and the Cocking or Cocker Spaniel.

At this point, both cocker spaniels and springer spaniels were born in the same litters. The purpose of the breed was to serve as a hunting dog. The smaller cockers were used to hunt woodcock, while their larger littermates, the springer spaniels, would "spring"—or flush—the gamebird into the air where a trained falcon or hawk would bring it to the handler.

Many spaniel breeds were developed during the 19th century, and often named after the counties in which they were developed, or after their owners, who were usually nobility. Two strains of larger land spaniel were predominant and were said to have been of "true springer type." These were the Norfolk and the Shropshire spaniels, and by the 1850s, these were shown under the breed name of Norfolk spaniel.

In January 1899, the Spaniel Club of England and the Sporting Spaniel Society held their trials together for the first time. Three years later, in 1902, a combination of the physical standard from the Spaniel Club of England and the ability standard from the Sporting Spaniel Society led to the English Springer Spaniel breed being officially recognized by the English Kennel Club. The American Kennel Club followed in 1910. In 1914, the first English Field Champion was crowned, FTC Rivington Sam, whose dam was a registered cocker spaniel, Rivington Riband. Sam is considered one of the foundation sires for modern field lines.

Skills
An English Springer Spaniel is foremost a game bird flushing dog. There are several skills that breeders train the dog to perform for their occupation.
 Retrieve to Hand Most hunters and all hunt test or field trial judges require that a dog deliver a bird to hand, meaning that a dog will hold the bird until told to give it to the hunter directly.
 Soft Mouth Springers are taught to deliver game with a soft mouth, meaning he does not puncture it with his teeth. The game should always be fit for the table. If a springer damages the bird, it may be hard-mouthed. This is a serious fault, but it can be difficult to determine whether it may have been genetic or caused by poor training methods. Breeders generally avoid using any springer that is hard-mouthed.
 Quarter A flushing spaniel's primary role is often as a game bird flushing dog. Dogs must work in a zig-zag pattern in front of the hunter seeking game birds. The dog is taught to stay within gun range to avoid flushing a bird outside shooting distance. This pattern is one of the primary criteria used to judge a dog in a field trial.
 Scenting Having the ability to scent game is of vital importance to the hunter. A springer should have a good nose in both wet and dry conditions. A dog with a good nose will learn to use the wind as it quests for game, ever adjusting its pattern according to the nuances of the wind.
 Flushing The springer should have a positive flush. It should not hesitate or point when encountering game. Some field trial dogs will often get airborne during a flush. This is exciting to watch but is not necessary to win. Most hunters prefer that their dog not flush in that style, as it can present a risk to the dog.
 Hup This is the traditional command to sit and stay. When hupped the dog can be given direction called by the handler. The ability to hup a dog actively working a running bird allows the handler and any gunners to keep up without having to run.
 Follow Hand Signals Game bird hunting involves pursuing wild game in its native habitat. Gun dogs must investigate likely covers for game birds. The dog must be responsive to hand signals for the hunter to be able to direct the dog into areas of particular interest.
 Steady When hunting game birds, a flushing dog should be steady to wing and shot, meaning that he sits when a bird rises or a gun is fired. He does this to mark the fall and to avoid flushing other birds when pursuing a missed bird.
 Blind Retrieve An adequately trained and experienced working springer can be expected to use all of the aforementioned attributes to be conducted by hand, whistle and command to a position whereby an unmarked lost game bird can be picked and retrieved to hand.

Detection dog

The Springer Spaniel is used as a sniffer dog. Notable search dogs have included Buster, a Dickin Medal recipient, Royal Army Veterinary Corps arms and explosives search dog serving with the Duke of Wellington's Regiment in Iraq, for finding an extremist group's hidden arsenal of weapons and explosives. Another example is Jake, aka Hubble Keck People's Dispensary for Sick Animals Gold Medal and Blue Cross Animal Hospital Medal recipient, a London Metropolitan Police explosives search dog. He was deployed at Tavistock Square, Russell Square and King's Cross following the 7 July 2005 London bombings.

The Springer is not limited to detecting explosives. Other varied uses for the Springer can include sniffing out bumblebee nests, illegal immigrants, blood and the superbug C. difficile. Springers are used for drug detection in the United States, United Kingdom, Sweden, Finland, Isle of Man, Ireland, Canada CBSA and Qatar.

The Springer Spaniel is also used as a search and rescue dog by mountain rescue and Lowland Rescue teams, where their willingness to work and cover rough terrain makes them an excellent choice.

Notable English Springer Spaniels

Awarded the Dickin Medal for conspicuous gallantry or devotion to duty while serving in military conflict:
 Theo
 Buster
Awarded the PDSA Gold Medal for animal bravery:
 Ghillie
Awarded the PDSA Order of Merit
 Max

See also
 Dogs portal
 List of dog breeds
 Hunting dog
 Sporting Group
 Cocker Spaniel
 Mountain Rescue

References

External links

 

Detection dogs
Dog breeds originating in England
FCI breeds
Spaniels
Gundogs